St. Peter's Church is a Church of England church in Ruddington, Nottinghamshire.

History

The chapel of St. Mary dating from 1459 became the parish church when St. Peter's Church, Flawford nearby was demolished in 1773.

The church was repaired in 1718, and was rebuilt in 1824 at a cost of £1,100, except the chancel and steeple, which are the only remaining parts of the ancient fabric. In 1773 its burial ground was consecrated, and enclosed with part of the materials of Flawford church.

Except for the tower, the rest of the church was rebuilt by Bell and Roper of Manchester. Work started on 1 June 1887 and the new church costing £12,000 was consecrated by Rt. Revd. George Ridding, Bishop of Southwell, on 1 November 1888.

It is thought that the font comes from the medieval church at Flawford.

Organ
The 3 manual pipe organ dates from 1908 and is by Brindley & Foster of Sheffield.

Organists

Alfred Cook 1900 - 1933 (joint organist and choirmaster)
Albert Cook 1900 - 1933 (organist, son of Alfred)
Eric A. Peach 1933 - 1949  (afterwards organist at St Mary's Church, Wymeswold)
Hugh Wayman 1949 - 1950 (dismissed by the vicar)
B.L. Buxton ca. 1950
Douglas H. Madden 1951 - 1953 (formerly assistant organist at St Mary's Church, Nottingham, afterwards organist at St Peter's Church, Nottingham)
Peter. S. Shepherd ca. 1972 ca. 1974
Arthur Smedley 1978 - 1988
Alan Mitchell 1988 - ???? (formerly organist at St Margaret’s Church, Aspley)

References

Churches completed in 1888
19th-century Church of England church buildings
Church of England church buildings in Nottinghamshire
Grade II listed churches in Nottinghamshire
Peter